Cornelia Dumler (born January 22, 1982, in Feuchtwangen), nicknamed "Conny", is a volleyball player from Germany; she played as an outside-hitter for the German Women's National Team since 2002.

She represented her native country in at the 2004 Summer Olympics, finishing in ninth place, and at the 2003 Women's European Volleyball Championship, finishing third.

Honours
 2003 European Championship — 3rd place
 2004 Olympic Games — 9th place 
 2005 FIVB World Grand Prix — 10th place
 2005 European Championship — 11th place
 2006 World Championship — 11th place
 2007 European Championship — 6th place

References

External links
 
 
 

1982 births
Living people
People from Ansbach (district)
Sportspeople from Middle Franconia
German women's volleyball players
Volleyball players at the 2004 Summer Olympics
Olympic volleyball players of Germany